Gabriel Araújo Carvalho (born January 29, 1992), known as Gabriel Araújo, is a Brazilian professional footballer who plays as a left back for Olimpia

Career
He made his professional debut for Cruzeiro in a 2–4 away draw to Figueirense in the Campeonato Brasileiro Série A on August 31, 2011. In June 2012, he was transferred to Vitória.

He played for Ukrainian club Stal Dniprodzerzhynsk in Ukrainian Premier League.

On August 19, 2022, he signed for Honduran club CD Olimpia

References

External links
 

1992 births
Living people
Brazilian footballers
Association football defenders
Campeonato Brasileiro Série A players
Campeonato Brasileiro Série B players
Campeonato Brasileiro Série C players
Cruzeiro Esporte Clube players
Esporte Clube Vitória players
Madureira Esporte Clube players
Macaé Esporte Futebol Clube players
FC Metalurh Donetsk players
FC Stal Kamianske players
Ypiranga Futebol Clube players
Clube Náutico Capibaribe players
Ukrainian Premier League players
Brazilian expatriate sportspeople in Ukraine
Brazilian expatriate footballers
Expatriate footballers in Ukraine
Sportspeople from Salvador, Bahia